Cartledge House is a historic home located at Batesburg-Leesville, Lexington County, South Carolina. It was built about 1898, and is a two-story, Victorian-era weatherboard dwelling.  It consists of a rectangular central block under a hipped roof with sheet metal shingles and a truncated ridge. Double gallery porches wrap around the front and side elevations on both stories ornamented by Tuscan order colonettes and turned balustrades. The front roof slope features a steep cross gable pierced by a circular vent.

It was listed on the National Register of Historic Places in 1982.

References

Houses on the National Register of Historic Places in South Carolina
Victorian architecture in South Carolina
Houses completed in 1898
Houses in Lexington County, South Carolina
National Register of Historic Places in Lexington County, South Carolina